The Friedrich Ebert Foundation (German: Friedrich-Ebert-Stiftung e.V.; Abbreviation: FES) is a German political party foundation associated with, but independent from, the Social Democratic Party of Germany (SPD). Established in 1925 as the political legacy of Friedrich Ebert, Germany's first democratically elected President, it is the largest and oldest of the German party-associated foundations. It is headquartered in Bonn and Berlin, and has offices and projects in over 100 countries. It is Germany's oldest organisation to promote democracy, political education, and promote students of outstanding intellectual abilities and personality.

History
The FES was named after Friedrich Ebert (1871–1925), the Social Democratic President of Germany, 1919–1925. In his will, he specified that the proceeds from donations at his funeral should be used to create a foundation.  The SPD chairman at the time, was given the responsibility of building this foundation, which he did a few days after Ebert's death in 1925. The main concern of the foundation was to work against discrimination of workers in the area of education: "The Friedrich Ebert Foundation pursues the goal of giving young, empowered proletarians government aid to fund an education at state-accredited institutions. As a basic principle, only those people who have a recommendation from the party organisation will receive funding." (SPD Yearbook 1926) By the end of 1931, 295 students had been funded with over 52,000 marks. At this point the funding of the foundation fell through, as a result of the Great Depression. The FES was a section of the Social Democratic Education and Culture Organisation, and was banned along with the party itself in 1933 by the Nazis.

In 1946, the FES was reinstituted at the founding assembly of the Socialist German Student Federation. In 1954, the FES was restructured into a charitable organisation "for the advancement of democratic education". This established the FES as an independent, self-contained institute. In addition to education programmes, the FES has also worked in the area of development aid since the 1960s. In this effort, it has supported democracy and freedom movements, for instance in the African National Congress (ANC), and played an important role in overcoming dictatorial regimes in Greece, Spain, and Portugal.  Thus it was not a coincidence that the Socialist Party of Portugal was formed in an FES school in the German town of Bad Münstereifel.

The German state did subsidize the work of the foundation with 170 Million Euros in 2018.

Friedrich-Ebert-Stiftung Academic Foundation
The Friedrich-Ebert-Stiftung Academic Foundation (FES) is one of thirteen state-funded organizations for the promotion of young talents (Begabtenförderwerke) in Germany. Less than 1% of German students achieve a scholarship at one of the thirteen organizations (i.e. FES, Studienstiftung, Konrad Adenauer Foundation, Friedrich Naumann Foundation, Hanns Seidel Foundation, Heinrich Böll Foundation, Rosa Luxemburg Foundation, Cusanuswerk, Ernst Ludwig Ehrlich Scholarship Fund). It is financially funded and subsidized by the Federal Ministry of Education and Research and supports students with outstanding academical and political achievements. Awards are granted after a multi-stage selection process and are based on grades, letters of recommendation, letters of motivation, political and social engagement as well as personality and character. Until today it has sponsored more than 12,000 grantees. Over 90% of those sponsored graduate with honours.  In 2005, there were 1,731 students in the programme, of which 51% were women.  

Beyond the financial support, grantees also receive so-called ideational support, which comes from opportunities to attend political seminars, conferences, and other activities, which can be important job qualifications. Students are assigned advisors who work with them for the length of their grants.

Each year, the grantees vote for a board during the nationwide conference at the Gustav Stresemann Institute in Bonn.  This board serves for the next full year as the representation of grantees for dialog with the foundation.  The FES maintains a website ( www.fes-stip.de) for networking among grantees, which includes a wide variety of mailing lists, services, and communications tools.

Since 1971, foreign students have also had the opportunity to receive grants through solidarity funds.  Preference for these grants goes to people who are persecuted on political, racial or religious grounds.  Funding for this program comes exclusively from donations from current and former grantees.  The program have helped over 1,000 students. Currently there are 31 students who are in the solidarity programme. Two grantees from this programme are chosen every year at the conference in Bonn to work on the steering committee of the fund.

Further activities

Today, the Friedrich Ebert Foundation's main goals are to promote political and societal education of people from all walks of life in the spirit of democracy and pluralism, to enable young people the opportunity to study and do research through grants, and to work toward international understanding and cooperation.

The foundation employs several hundred employees in their offices in Bonn and Berlin, as well as in 14 regional offices and an academy within Germany and in over 100 foreign agencies.  It is financed mainly through grants from the federal budget and the budgets of the various Bundesländer.

The FES had its own conference center on the Venusberg in Bonn for these activities until its closure in 2009.  

The historical research center of the foundation also contains the Archive of Social Democracy and its libraries in Bonn and at the Karl Marx House in Trier.  This is one of the largest collections of documents on social history and the history of the workers movement.

Since 1982, the foundation has awarded a prize of 10,000 euro called Das politische Buch ("The Political Book") to promote noteworthy political books. The prize serves to remind people of the Nazi book burnings of May 10, 1933.

Controversy
In 2017, Friedrich Ebert Foundation was attacked by a group dubbed “Pawn Storm”, the same cyber spy group that targeted that year's campaign of French presidential candidate Emmanuel Macron; the group used email phishing tricks and attempted to install malware at the foundation.

In 2022, the Friedrich Ebert Foundation was barred from working in Russia.

Leadership
 1953–1970: Gerhard Weisser 
 1970–1983:  
 1983–1987: Heinz Kühn 
 1987–2003: Holger Börner (chairman laureate from 2003 until his death in 2006)
 2003–2010: Anke Fuchs 
 2010–2012: Peter Struck 
 2013–2020: Kurt Beck and Dieter Schulte (interim since Struck's death)
 2020–present: Martin Schulz

See also
 Konrad Adenauer Foundation (CDU)
 Hanns Seidel Foundation (CSU)
 Friedrich Naumann Foundation für die Freiheit (FDP)
 Heinrich Böll Foundation (Grüne)
 Rosa Luxemburg Foundation (Die Linke)
 Desiderius-Erasmus-Stiftung (AfD)

References

External links

  
 FES OnlineAkademie
 Library of the Friedrich Ebert Foundation
 Archive of Social Democracy
 Website for Grantees of the Friedrich Ebert Foundation

Foundations based in Germany
Political organisations based in Germany
Educational foundations
Education in Germany
Charities based in Germany
Social democratic organizations
Social Democratic Party of Germany
Socialism in Germany
Socialist education
Political and economic research foundations
Organisations based in Bonn
Political and economic think tanks based in Germany
Non-profit organisations based in North Rhine-Westphalia